Skórzewo may refer to the following places:
 
Skórzewo, Greater Poland Voivodeship, a village adjoining the Grunwald district of Poznań
Skórzewo, Kuyavian-Pomeranian Voivodeship (north-central Poland)
Skórzewo, Pomeranian Voivodeship (north Poland)